Mabunda is a surname. Notable people with the surname include:

 Gonçalo Mabunda (born 1975), Mozambican artist
 Jeannine Mabunda (born 1964), Congolese lawyer and politician
 Samuel Mabunda (born 1988), South African footballer

Bantu-language surnames